Warsan Shire  (born 1 August 1988) is a British writer, poet, editor and teacher, who was born to Somali parents in Kenya. In 2013 she was awarded the inaugural Brunel University African Poetry Prize, chosen from a shortlist of six candidates out of a total 655 entries. Her words "No one leaves home unless/home is the mouth of a shark", from the poem "Conversations about Home (at a deportation centre)", have been called "a rallying call for refugees and their advocates".

Life and career
Born on 1 August 1988 in Kenya to Somali parents, Shire migrated with her family to the United Kingdom at the age of one. She has four siblings. She has a Bachelor of Arts degree in Creative Writing. As of 2015, she primarily resides in Los Angeles, California.

In 2011, she released Teaching My Mother How To Give Birth, a poetry pamphlet published by flipped eye. Her full collection was released in 2016, also through flipped eye.

Shire has read her poetry in various artistic venues throughout the world, including in the United Kingdom, Italy, Germany, North America, South Africa and Kenya. Her poems have been published in various literary publications, including Poetry Review, Magma and Wasafiri. Additionally, Shire's verse has been featured in the collections Salt Book of Younger Poets (Salt, 2011), Ten: The New Wave (Bloodaxe, 2014), and New Daughters of Africa (edited by Margaret Busby, 2019). Her poetry has also been translated into a number of languages, including Italian, Spanish, Portuguese, Swedish, Danish and Estonian.

As of 2016, Shire is working on her first full-length poetry collection, having put out a limited-release pamphlet called Her Blue Body in 2015. She serves as the poetry editor at SPOOK magazine and she teaches poetry workshops both globally and online for cathartic and aesthetic purposes.

Shire's poetry featured prominently in Beyoncé's 2016 feature-length film Lemonade. Knowles-Carter's interest in using Shire's work was sparked with Shire's piece "For Women Who Are Difficult to Love".
Shire published Bless the Daughter Raised by a Voice in Her Head: Poems on March 1, 2022. It was reviewed in The New Yorker.

Shire was interviewed on NPR's Weekend Edition Sunday by Sarah McCammon on February 27, 2022 to discuss her new book.

Influences 
Shire uses not only her own personal experiences but also the experiences of people to whom she is close. She is quoted as saying: "I either know, or I am, every person I have written about, for or as. But I do imagine them in their most intimate settings." Her main interest is writing about and for people who are generally not heard otherwise, e.g. immigrants and refugees as well as other marginalized groups of people. Shire is also quoted as saying: "I also navigate a lot through memory, my memories and other people's memories, trying to essentially just make sense of stuff." As a first-generation immigrant, she has used her poetry to connect with her home country of Somalia, which she has never been to but which she describes as "a nation of poets". She uses her position as an immigrant herself to convey the lives of these peoples. Shire utilizes the influences of her close relatives, and family members and their experiences to depict in her poetry the struggles that they have all faced.

Awards and honours
Shire has received various awards for her art. In April 2013, she was presented with Brunel University's inaugural African Poetry Prize, an award earmarked for poets who have yet to publish a full-length poetry collection. She was chosen from a shortlist of six candidates out of a total 655 entries.

In October 2013, Shire was selected from a shortlist of six as the first Young Poet Laureate for London. The honour is part of the London Legacy Development Corporation's Spoke programme, which focuses on promoting arts and culture in Queen Elizabeth Olympic Park and the surrounding area.

In 2014, Shire was also chosen as poet-in-residence of Queensland, Australia, liaising with the Aboriginal Centre for Performing Arts over a six-week period.

In June 2018 Shire was elected Fellow of the Royal Society of Literature in its "40 Under 40" initiative.

Her first full-length collection of poetry, Bless the Daughter Raised by a Voice in Her Head, was announced on the shortlist of the 2022 Felix Dennis Prize for Best First Collection.

Personal life
She lives in Los Angeles, with her husband, Andres Reyes-Manzo, and their two young children.

Publications

 Teaching My Mother How To Give Birth (flipped eye, 2011), 
 Her Blue Body (flap pamphlet series, flipped eye, 2015), 
 Poems including "The Unbearable Weight of Staying", "Dear Moon", "How to Wear Your Mother's Lipstick", "Nail Technician as Palm Reader", and "For Women Who Are Difficult to Love" featured on Lemonade: A Visual Album by Beyoncé (2016)
 Penguin Modern Poets 3: Your Family, Your Body by Malika Booker, Sharon Olds, Warsan Shire (Penguin, 2017). 
 Bless the Daughter Raised by a Voice in Her Head: Poems (Random House, 2022),

See also 
 Unless the Water is Safer than the Land

References

External links

 
 Warsan Shire at Rocking Chair Books Literary Agency
 Ellen E. Jones, "Warsan Shire talks to Bernardine Evaristo about becoming a superstar poet: 'Beyoncé sent flowers when my children were born'", The Guardian, 26 February 2022.

1988 births
Living people
21st-century British poets
21st-century British women writers
21st-century Somalian writers
Black British women writers
British women poets
English people of Somali descent
Ethnic Somali people
Fellows of the Royal Society of Literature
Kenyan emigrants to the United Kingdom
Kenyan people of Somali descent
Somalian women poets